The neuroscience of sex differences is the study of characteristics that separate the male and female brain. Psychological sex differences are thought by some to reflect the interaction of genes, hormones, and social learning on brain development throughout the lifespan.

A 2021 meta-synthesis of existing literature found that sex accounted for 1% of the brain's structure or laterality, finding large group-level differences only in total brain volume. A review from 2006 and a meta-analysis from 2014 found that some evidence from brain morphology and function studies indicates that male and female brains cannot always be assumed to be identical from either a structural or functional perspective, and some brain structures are sexually dimorphic.

History
The ideas of differences between the male and female brain have circulated since the time of Ancient Greek philosophers around 850 BC. In 1854, German anatomist Emil Huschke discovered a size difference in the frontal lobe, where male frontal lobes are 1% larger than those of females. As the 19th century progressed, scientists began researching sexual dimorphisms in the brain significantly more. Until recent decades, scientists knew of several structural sexual dimorphisms of the brain, but they did not think that sex had any impact on how the human brain performs daily tasks. Through molecular, animal, and neuroimaging studies, a great deal of information regarding the differences between male and female brains and how much they differ in regards to both structure and function has been uncovered.

Evolutionary explanations

Sexual selection

Females show enhanced information recall compared to males. This may be due to the fact that females have a more intricate evaluation of risk–scenario contemplation, based on a prefrontal cortical control of the amygdala. For example, the ability to recall information better than males most likely originated from sexual selective pressures on females during competition with other females in mate selection. Recognition of social cues was an advantageous characteristic, because it ultimately maximized offspring and was therefore selected for during evolution.

Oxytocin is a hormone that induces contraction of the uterus and lactation in mammals and is also a characteristic hormone of nursing mothers. Studies have found that oxytocin improves spatial memory. Through activation of the MAP kinase pathway, oxytocin plays a role in the enhancement of long-term synaptic plasticity, which is a change in strength between two neurons over a synapse that lasts for minutes or longer, and long-term memory. This hormone may have helped mothers remember the location of distant food sources so they could better nurture their offspring.

According to certain studies, men on average have one standard deviation higher spatial intelligence quotient than women. This domain is one of the few where clear sex differences in cognition appear. Researchers at the University of Toronto say that differences between men and women on some tasks that require spatial skills are largely eliminated after both groups play a video game for only a few hours. Although Herman Witkin had claimed women are more "visually dependent" than men, this has recently been disputed.

The gender difference in spatial ability was found to be attributed to morphological differences between male and female brains. The parietal lobe is a part of the brain that is recognized to be involved in spatial ability, especially in 2d- and 3d mental rotation. Researchers at the University of Iowa found that the thicker grey matter in the parietal lobe of females led to a disadvantage in mental rotations, and that the larger surface areas of the parietal lobe of males led to an advantage in mental rotations. The results found by the researches support the notion that gender differences in spatial abilities arose during human evolution such that both sexes cognitively and neurologically developed to behave adaptively. However, the effect of socialization and environment on the difference in spatial ability is still open for debate.

Male and female brain anatomy 
A 2021 meta-synthesis of existing literature found that sex accounted for 1% of the brain's structure or laterality, finding large group-level differences only in total brain volume.

Many similarities and differences in structure, neurotransmitters, and function have been identified, but some academics, such as Cordelia Fine and Anelis Kaiser, Sven Haller, Sigrid Schmitz, and Cordula Nitsch dispute the existence of significant sex differences in the brain, arguing that innate differences in the neurobiology of women and men have not been conclusively identified due to factors such as alleged neurosexism, methodological flaws and publication bias. Clinical psychologist Simon Baron-Cohen has defended the neuroscience of sex differences against charges of neurosexism, arguing that "Fine's neurosexism allegation is the mistaken blurring of science with politics.", adding that "You can be a scientist interested in the nature of sex differences while being a clear supporter of equal opportunities and a firm opponent of all forms of discrimination in society."

Males and females differ in some aspects of their brains, notably the overall difference in size, with men having larger brains on average (between 8% and 13% larger), but a relationship between brain volume or density and brain function is not established. Additionally, there are differences in activation patterns that suggest anatomical or developmental differences.

Volume 

Structurally, adult male brains are on average 11–12% heavier and 10% bigger than female brains. Though statistically there are sex differences in white matter and gray matter percentage, this ratio is directly related to brain size, and some argue these sex differences in gray and white matter percentage are caused by the average size difference between men and women. Others argue that these differences partly remain after controlling for brain volume.

Researchers also found greater cortical thickness and cortical complexity in females before, and after adjusting for overall brain volume. In contrast, surface area, brain volume and fractional anisotropy was found to be greater in males before, and after adjusting for overall brain volume. Despite attributes remaining greater for both male and female, the overall difference in these attributes decreased after adjusting for overall brain volume, except the cortical thickness in females, which increased. Given that cortical complexity and cortical features have had some evidence of positive correlation with intelligence, researchers postulated that these differences might have evolved for females to compensate for smaller brain size and equalize overall cognitive abilities with males, though the reason for environmental selection of that trait is unknown. 

Researchers further analyzed the differences in brain volume, surface area and cortical thickness by testing the men and women on verbal-numerical reasoning and reaction time in separate groups. It was found that the group of men slightly outperformed the women in both the verbal-numerical reasoning and reaction time tests. Subsequently, the researchers tested to what extent the differences in performance was mediated by the varying attributes of the male and female brain (eg. surface area) using two mixed sample groups. In verbal-numerical reasoning tests, surface area and brain volume mediated performance by >82% in both groups, and cortical thickness mediated performance far less, by 7.1% and 5.4% in each group. In reaction time tests, total brain and white matter volumes mediated performance by >27%, but the other attributes all mediated performance by smaller percentages (<15.3%), particularly mean cortical thickness (mediating <3% of performance). 

According to the neuroscience journal review series Progress in Brain Research, it has been found that males have larger and longer planum temporale and Sylvian fissure while females have significantly larger proportionate volumes to total brain volume in the superior temporal cortex, Broca's area, the hippocampus and the caudate. The midsagittal and fiber numbers in the anterior commissure that connect the temporal poles and mass intermedia that connects the thalami is also larger in women.

Lateralization
Lateralization may differ between the sexes, with men often being said to have a more lateralized brain. This is often attributed to differences in "left-" and "right-" brained abilities. One factor that contributes support to the idea that there is a sex difference in brain lateralization is that men are more likely to be left-handed. However, it is unclear whether this is due to a difference in lateralization.

A 2014 meta-analysis of grey matter in the brain found sexually dimorphic areas of the brain in both volume and density. When synthesized, these differences show that volume increases for males tend to be on the left side of systems, while females generally see greater volume in the right hemisphere. On the other hand, a previous 2008 meta-analysis found that the difference between male and female brain lateralization was not significant.

Amygdala

There are behavioral differences between males and females that may suggest a difference in amygdala size or function. A 2017 review of amygdala volume studies found that there was a raw size difference, with males having a 10% larger amygdala, however, because male brains are larger, this finding was found to be misleading. After normalizing for brain size, there was no significant difference in size of the amygdala across sex.

In terms of activation, there is no difference in amygdala activation across sex. Differences in behavioral tests may be due to potential anatomical and physiological differences in the amygdala across sexes rather than activation differences.

Emotional expression, understanding, and behavior appears to vary between males and females. A 2012 review concluded that males and females have differences in the processing of emotions. Males tend to have stronger reactions to threatening stimuli and that males react with more physical violence.

Hippocampus
Hippocampus atrophy is associated with a variety of psychiatric disorders that have higher prevalence in females. Additionally, there are differences in memory skills between males and females which may suggest a difference in the hippocampal volume (HCV). A 2016 meta-analysis of volume differences found a higher HCV in males without correcting for total brain size. However, after adjusting for individual differences and total brain volume, they found no significant sex difference, despite the expectation that women may have larger hippocampus volume.

Grey matter 

A 2014 meta-analysis found (where differences were measured) some differences in grey matter levels between the sexes. 

The findings included females having more grey matter volume in the right frontal pole, inferior and middle frontal gyrus, pars triangularis, planum temporale/parietal operculum, anterior cingulate gyrus, insular cortex, and Heschl's gyrus; both thalami and precuneus; the left parahippocampal gyrus and lateral occipital cortex (superior division). Larger volumes in females were most pronounced in areas in the right hemisphere related to language in addition to several limbic structures such as the right insular cortex and anterior cingulate gyrus. 

Males had more grey matter volume in both amygdalae, hippocampi, anterior parahippocampal gyri, posterior cingulate gyri, precuneus, putamen and temporal poles, areas in the left posterior and anterior cingulate gyri, and areas in the cerebellum bilateral VIIb, VIIIa and Crus I lobes, left VI and right Crus II lobes.

In terms of density, there were also differences between the sexes. Males tended to have a denser left amygdala, hippocampus, insula, pallidum, putamen, claustrum, and areas of the right VI lobule of the cerebellum, among other areas. Females tended to have denser left frontal pole. 

The significance of these differences lies both in the lateralization (males having more volume in the left hemisphere and females having more volume in the right hemisphere) and the possible uses of these findings to explore differences in neurological and psychiatric conditions.

Transgender studies on brain anatomy 

Early postmortem studies of transgender neurological differentiation were focused on the hypothalamic and amygdala regions of the brain. Using magnetic resonance imaging (MRI), some trans women were found to have female-typical putamina that were larger in size than those of cisgender males. Some trans women have also shown a female-typical central part of the bed nucleus of the stria terminalis (BSTc) and interstitial nucleus of the anterior hypothalamus number 3 (INAH-3), looking at the number of neurons found within each.

Brain networks 
Both males and females have consistent active working memory networks composed of both middle frontal gyri, the left cingulate gyrus, the right precuneus, the left inferior and superior parietal lobes, the right claustrum, and the left middle temporal gyrus. Although the same brain networks are used for working memory, specific regions are sex-specific. Sex differences were evident in other networks, as women also tend to have higher activity in the prefrontal and limbic regions, such as the anterior cingulate, bilateral amygdala, and right hippocampus, while men tend to have a distributed network spread out among the cerebellum, portions of the superior parietal lobe, the left insula, and bilateral thalamus.

A 2017 review from the perspective of large-scale brain networks hypothesized that women's higher susceptibility to stress-prone diseases such as posttraumatic stress disorder and major depressive disorder, in which the salience network is theorized to be overactive and to interfere with the executive control network, may be due in part, along with societal exposure to stressors and the coping strategies that are available to women, to underlying sex-based brain differences.

Neurochemical differences

Hormones
Gonadal hormones, or sex hormones, include androgens (such as testosterone) and estrogens (such as estradiol), which are steroid hormones synthesized primarily in the testes and ovaries, respectively. Sex hormone production is regulated by the gonadotropic hormones luteinizing hormone (LH) and follicle-stimulating hormone (FSH), whose release from the anterior pituitary is stimulated by gonadotropin-releasing hormone (GnRH) from the hypothalamus.

Steroid hormones have several effects on brain development as well as maintenance of homeostasis throughout adulthood. Estrogen receptors have been found in the hypothalamus, pituitary gland, hippocampus, and frontal cortex, indicating the estrogen plays a role in brain development. Gonadal hormone receptors have also been found in the basal fore-brain nuclei.

Estrogen and the female brain
Estradiol influences cognitive function, specifically by enhancing learning and memory in a dose-sensitive manner. Too much estrogen can have negative effects by weakening performance of learned tasks as well as hindering performance of memory tasks; this can result in females exhibiting poorer performance of such tasks when compared to males.

Ovariectomies, surgeries inducing menopause, or natural menopause cause fluctuating and decreased estrogen levels in women. This in turn can "attenuate the effects" of endogenous opioid peptides. Opioid peptides are known to play a role in emotion and motivation. The content of β-endorphin (β-EP), an endogenous opioid peptide, has been found to decrease (in varying amounts/brain region) post ovariectomy in female rats within the hypothalamus, hippocampus, and pituitary gland. Such a change in β-EP levels could be the cause of mood swings, behavioral disturbances, and hot flashes in post menopausal women.

Progesterone and the male and female brain 
Progesterone is a steroid hormone synthesized in both male and female brains. It contains characteristics found in the chemical nucleus of both estrogen and androgen hormones. As a female sex hormone, progesterone is more significant in females than in males. During the menstrual cycle, progesterone increases just after the ovulatory phase to inhibit luteinizing hormones, such as oxytocin absorption. In men, increased progesterone has been linked to adolescents with suicidal ideation.

Testosterone and the male brain
The gonadal hormone testosterone is an androgenic, or masculinizing, hormone that is synthesized in both the male testes and female ovaries, at a rate of about 14,000 μg/day and 600 μg/day, respectively. Testosterone exerts organizational effects on the developing brain, many of which are mediated through estrogen receptors following its conversion to estrogen by the enzyme aromatase within the brain.

See also

References

Further reading

Behavioral neuroscience
Sex differences in humans